Timbira refers to a number of related ethnolinguistic groups of Timbira-speaking Gê peoples native to Northern and Northeastern Brazil. Among those peoples grouped under the name are the Apanyekrá, Apinajé, Kanela, Gavião (Jê), Krahô, Krinkatí, and Pukobyê.

References 

Indigenous peoples in Brazil
Indigenous peoples of Eastern Brazil